Landford Bog is an 11.6 hectare biological Site of Special Scientific Interest at Landford in southeast Wiltshire, England. It was notified in 1987.

The site is managed as a nature reserve by Wiltshire Wildlife Trust.

Sources
 Natural England citation sheet for the site (accessed 7 April 2022)

External links
 Landford Bog - Wiltshire Wildlife Trust
 Natural England website (SSSI information)

Sites of Special Scientific Interest in Wiltshire
Sites of Special Scientific Interest notified in 1987
Wiltshire Wildlife Trust reserves